Coleophora darigangae is a moth of the family Coleophoridae. It is found in Mongolia.

References

darigangae
Moths described in 1976
Moths of Asia